CIKO-FM is a Canadian high school radio station, broadcasting at 97.5 FM in Carcross, Yukon.

Owned and operated by Carcross Radio Society (Ghuch Tla Community School, formerly known as Carcross Community School), the station was licensed by the CRTC on October 2, 1997.

See also 
List of high school radio stations in Canada

References

External links

Iko
Iko